Barnsley by-election may refer to:

 1897 Barnsley by-election, played a role in development of the ILP
 1938 Barnsley by-election
 1953 Barnsley by-election
 1996 Barnsley East by-election, caused loss of Conservatives' parliamentary majority
 2011 Barnsley Central by-election, followed the jailing of Eric Illsley; Lib Dem vote collapsed